Edward Buckingham (born 1948) was Attorney General of the Northern Mariana Islands from 2009–2012.

Edward Buckingham may also refer to:

Ed Buckingham (fl. 2007–2011), a politician in Newfoundland and Labrador, Canada
Eddie Buckingham, Edward Buckingham, character in the Australian television show Neighbours
Edward Taylor Buckingham, 48th and 52nd Mayor of Bridgeport, Connecticut from 1909–1911 and 1929–1933

See also